António Agostinho da Silva Neto (17 September 1922 – 10 September 1979) was an Angolan politician and poet. He served as the first president of Angola from 1975 to 1979, having led the Popular Movement for the Liberation of Angola (MPLA) in the war for independence (1961–1974). Until his death, he led the MPLA in the civil war (1975–2002). Known also for his literary activities, he is considered Angola's preeminent poet. His birthday is celebrated as National Heroes' Day, a public holiday in Angola.

Early life
Neto was born at Ícolo e Bengo, in Bengo Province, Angola, in 1922. Neto attended high school in the capital city, Luanda; his parents were both school teachers and Methodists; his father, also called Agostinho Neto, was a Methodist pastor. After secondary school he worked in the colonial health services before going on to university. The younger Neto left Angola for Portugal, and studied medicine at the universities of Coimbra and Lisbon. He combined his academic life with covert political activity of a revolutionary sort; and PIDE, the security police force of the Estado Novo regime headed by Portuguese Prime Minister Salazar, arrested him in 1951 for three months for his separatist activism. He was arrested again in 1952 for joining the Portuguese Movement for Democratic Youth Unity. He was arrested again in 1955 and held until 1957. He finished his studies, marrying a 23-year-old Portuguese woman who was born in Trás-os-Montes, Maria Eugénia da Silva, the same day he graduated. He returned to Angola in 1959, was arrested again in 1960, and escaped to assume leadership of the armed struggle against colonial rule. When Angola gained independence in 1975 he became president and held the position until his death in 1979.

Political career
In December 1956, the Angolan Communist Party (PCA) merged with the Party of the United Struggle for Africans in Angola (PLUA) to form the Popular Movement for the Liberation of Angola with Viriato da Cruz, the President of the PCA, as Secretary General and Neto as president.

The Portuguese authorities in Angola arrested Neto on 8 June 1960. His patients and supporters marched for his release from Bengo to Catete, but were stopped when Portuguese soldiers shot at them, killing 30 and wounding 200 in what became known as the Massacre of Icolo e Bengo. At first Portugal's government exiled Neto to Cape Verde. Then, once more, he was sent to jail in Lisbon. After international protests were made to Salazar's administration urging Neto's release, Neto was freed from prison and put under house arrest. From this he escaped, going first to Morocco and then to Congo-Léopoldville.

In 1962 Neto visited Washington, D.C., and asked the Kennedy administration for aid in his war against Portugal. The U.S. government turned him down, because it had oil interests in colonial Angola, choosing instead to support Holden Roberto's comparatively anti-Communist National Liberation Front of Angola (FNLA).

Neto met Che Guevara in 1965 and began receiving support from Cuba. He visited Havana many times, and he and Fidel Castro shared similar ideological views.

Following the Carnation Revolution in Portugal during April 1974 (which deposed Salazar's successor Marcelo Caetano), three political factions vied for Angolan power. One of the three was the MPLA, to which Neto belonged. On 11 November 1975, Angola achieved full independence from the Portuguese, and Neto became the nation's ruler after the MPLA seized Luanda at the expense of the other anti-colonial movements. He established a one-party state and his government developed close links with the Soviet Union and other nations in the Eastern Bloc and other Communist states, particularly Cuba, which aided the MPLA considerably in its war with the FNLA, the National Union for the Total Independence of Angola (UNITA) and South Africa. Neto made the MPLA declare Marxism-Leninism its official doctrine. As a consequence, he violently repressed a movement later called Fractionism which in 1977 attempted a coup d'état inspired by the Organização dos Comunistas de Angola. In December 1977 at their first congress, they changed their name to MPLA-PT (MPLA Partido do Trabalho) officially adopting the Marxist-Leninist ideology, requested by Nito Alves. Tens of thousands of followers (or alleged followers) of Nito Alves were executed in the aftermath of the attempted coup, over a period that lasted up to two years, although Agostinho Neto only ratified the death sentence of Nito Alves. After corresponding with several relatives of the disappeared, Neto decided to dissolve the Directorate of Information and Security for the "excesses" they had committed.

According to his sons, the president Neto never assigned business or privileges to them, suggesting that despite a controversial presidency he never forgot his humble origins.

Neto died in a hospital in Moscow, while undergoing surgery for cancer, shortly before his 57th birthday. José Eduardo dos Santos succeeded him as president. The Angolan Civil War continued to rage for almost a quarter of a century more.

Literary career

Agostinho Neto's poetic works were written chiefly between 1946 and 1960, largely in Portugal. He published three books of poetry during his lifetime. Several of his poems became national anthems. Poems included collections like Sacred Hope, which was published in 1974 (Titled Dry Eyes in the Portuguese Version). Also, he was the first member voted into the Anglo Writers Union and The Center for African Studies in Lisbon. He was later awarded the Lotus Prize presented by the Conference of Afro-Asian Writers'

Death

Agostinho Neto died on Monday, 10 September 1979 in Moscow after travelling to the Soviet Union to undergo surgery for cancer and hepatitis. He was a week shy of his 57th birthday at the time of his death. Neto had a long battle with pancreatic cancer, as well as chronic hepatitis that ultimately took his life. Neto had been to the Soviet Union multiple times for treatment because of the high level of medical professionals there. Few people knew about his failing health because he and his colleagues thought it was better to hide this information, as to not show weakness.

Legacy
The Soviet Union awarded Neto the Lenin Peace Prize for 1975–76.

The public university of Luanda, the Agostinho Neto University, is named after him. A poem by Chinua Achebe entitled Agostinho Neto was written in his honor. An airport in Santo Antão, Cape Verde, is named after him, due to the beloved work he performed there as a doctor. For the same reason, the main hospital of Cape Verde in the capital Praia is named "Hospital Agostinho Neto" (HAN). There is also a morna dedicated to him. A street in New Belgrade in Serbia is named after him, the Dr Agostina Neta street.

A street in Ghana (Agostinho Neto Road), which can be found in Airport City in the capital, is named after him.

In 1973, during one of his few unofficial visits to Bulgaria, Neto met a woman with whom he had a daughter, Mihaela Radkova Marinova, who was raised in orphanages in Bulgaria. Neto's family has not recognised the child. A DNA test performed in 2013 concluded with 95% confidence that she is Neto's daughter.

Foreign honours
 
  Order of Amílcar Cabral, First Class
 
 Recipient of the Order of Playa Girón
 
  Grand Cross of the National Order of Merit
 
  Order of the Most Ancient Welwitschia Mirabilis
 
  Order of Merit of the Republic of Poland, First Class
 
  Supreme Commander of the Order of the Companions of O. R. Tambo
 
 Lenin Peace Prize
 
  Order of the Yugoslav Star
 
 Recipient of the Royal Order of Munhumutapa

References

External links

Encyclopedia

Angolan revolutionaries
Presidents of Angola
1922 births
1979 deaths
People from Bengo Province
Angolan communists
Angolan escapees
Lenin Peace Prize recipients
Angolan writers
Escapees from Portuguese detention
Lenin Prize winners
Portuguese-language writers
MPLA politicians
University of Coimbra alumni
University of Lisbon alumni
Communism in Angola
20th-century Angolan politicians
Angolan independence activists
Angolan expatriates in Portugal